Pedro Acedo Penco (born February 1, 1955, in Badajoz, Spain) is a Spanish politician. He is the former Mayor of Mérida and legislator of the 12th Cortes Generales in the senate of Spain.

References 

Living people
1955 births
People from Badajoz
Spanish politicians